International Robot were a punk rock band from Minneapolis, Minnesota, founded in 2000. All of the group's members went on to form other notable bands on the Minneapolis punk scene, including the Soviettes, The Awesome Snakes, France Has The Bomb, the Dummies, the Prostitutes, the Voltz, the Dynamiters, Die Electric! and Dirty Robbers.  All of these bands, including International Robot, have been covered by City Pages, the local music weekly newspaper.

The band's name is taken from a song title of the Saints, an Australian band that formed in the late 1970s.

Members
Brian Shuey (guitar, vocals) - the Dynamiters, The Voltz, Die Electric!, the Prostitutes 
Morgan "Slo Mo" Kinnaman (bass) - Dirty Robbers 
Danny Henry (drums, vocals) - The Soviettes, The Awesome Snakes, France Has The Bomb, the Dummies (as "Rock Bottom") 
Annie Holoien (bass) - The Soviettes, The Awesome Snakes, God Damn Doo Wop Band

Discography

Albums

EPs and singles

References

External links

"Front Door" on YouTube

Musical groups from Minnesota